Penry Herbert Williams (25 February 1925 – 30 April 2013) was a Welsh historian of Elizabethan Britain.

Early life
He was born in Calcutta to a father from Brecknockshire and he was educated at Marlborough College. During the Second World War Williams served in India and Java as a member of the Royal Artillery. He then read history at New College, Oxford, where J. E. Neale suggested he study Wales under the government of Elizabeth I. His doctoral thesis, The Council in the Marches of Wales under Elizabeth I, was published in 1958.

Academic career
He taught history at the Victoria University of Manchester from 1951 until 1964 and at New College from 1964 until 1992.

In his 1979 work, The Tudor Regime, Williams repudiated Geoffrey Elton's focus on the central administrative institutions of government in The Tudor Revolution in Government, and instead asserted the importance of local patronage and favouritism. Williams argued that "the strength of Tudor government lay in a skilful combination of the formal and the informal, the official and the personal".

He edited The English Historical Review from 1982 until 1990. He wrote The Later Tudors: England, 1547–1603 (1995) for the New Oxford History of England series.

Personal life
Williams married in 1952. His politics were moderately left-wing; he first supported Labour, then the SDP and finally the Liberal Democrats. He also campaigned on behalf of asylum seekers, including those held at Campsfield House immigration detention centre, which he frequently visited.

Works

Books
The Council in the Marches of Wales under Elizabeth I (University of Wales Press, 1958). 
Life in Tudor England (London: B. T. Batsford, 1964). 
The Tudor Regime (Oxford: Oxford University Press, 1979). 
The Later Tudors: England, 1547–1603 (Oxford: Clarendon Press, 1995). 
(with Mark Nicholls), Sir Walter Raleigh: In Life and Legend (London: Bloomsbury Continuum, 2011).

Articles
‘Dr. Elton's Interpretation of the Age’, Past & Present, No. 25 (Jul., 1963), pp. 3–8.
‘The Tudor State’, Past & Present, No. 25 (Jul., 1963), pp. 39–58.
(with G. L. Harriss), ‘A Revolution in Tudor History?’, Past & Present, No. 31 (Jul., 1965), pp. 87–96.

Notes

1925 births
2013 deaths
20th-century Welsh historians
People educated at Marlborough College
Alumni of New College, Oxford
Academics of the Victoria University of Manchester
British Army personnel of World War II
Fellows of New College, Oxford
Royal Artillery officers